Morristown (Baile Mhoirein) is a community in the Canadian province of Nova Scotia, located in Antigonish County. It was established as a township in 1856.

References

Communities in Antigonish County, Nova Scotia